SECAB Institute of Engineering & Technology  was established in 2002. It offers five undergraduate programs besides research programs in two disciplines. It is affiliated to Visvesvaraya Technological University (VTU) in Belgaum and its undergraduate programs are recognized by the All India Council for Technical Education (AICTE).

Introduction 
The college is recognized by the AICTE (New Delhi) and approved by the Government of Karnataka. It is recognized as an authorized institute to transfer the technology and courses offered by the joint collaboration of VTU Belgaum.

Courses 
The institute offers the following undergraduate courses recognized by AICTE, the Government of Karnataka and affiliated to Visveswariah Technological University

Undergraduate Courses

Civil Engineering
Computer Science and Engineering
Electrical & Electronics Engineering
Electronics and Communication Engineering
Mechanical Engineering
Master of Business Administration(M.B.A).
Bachelors of Architecture 
Masters in Architecture  (Construction and project management)

References

Affiliates of Visvesvaraya Technological University
Engineering colleges in Karnataka
Universities and colleges in Tumkur district